= Palacio de Gobierno de Tabasco =

Coordinates: 17.9880°N 92.9195°W

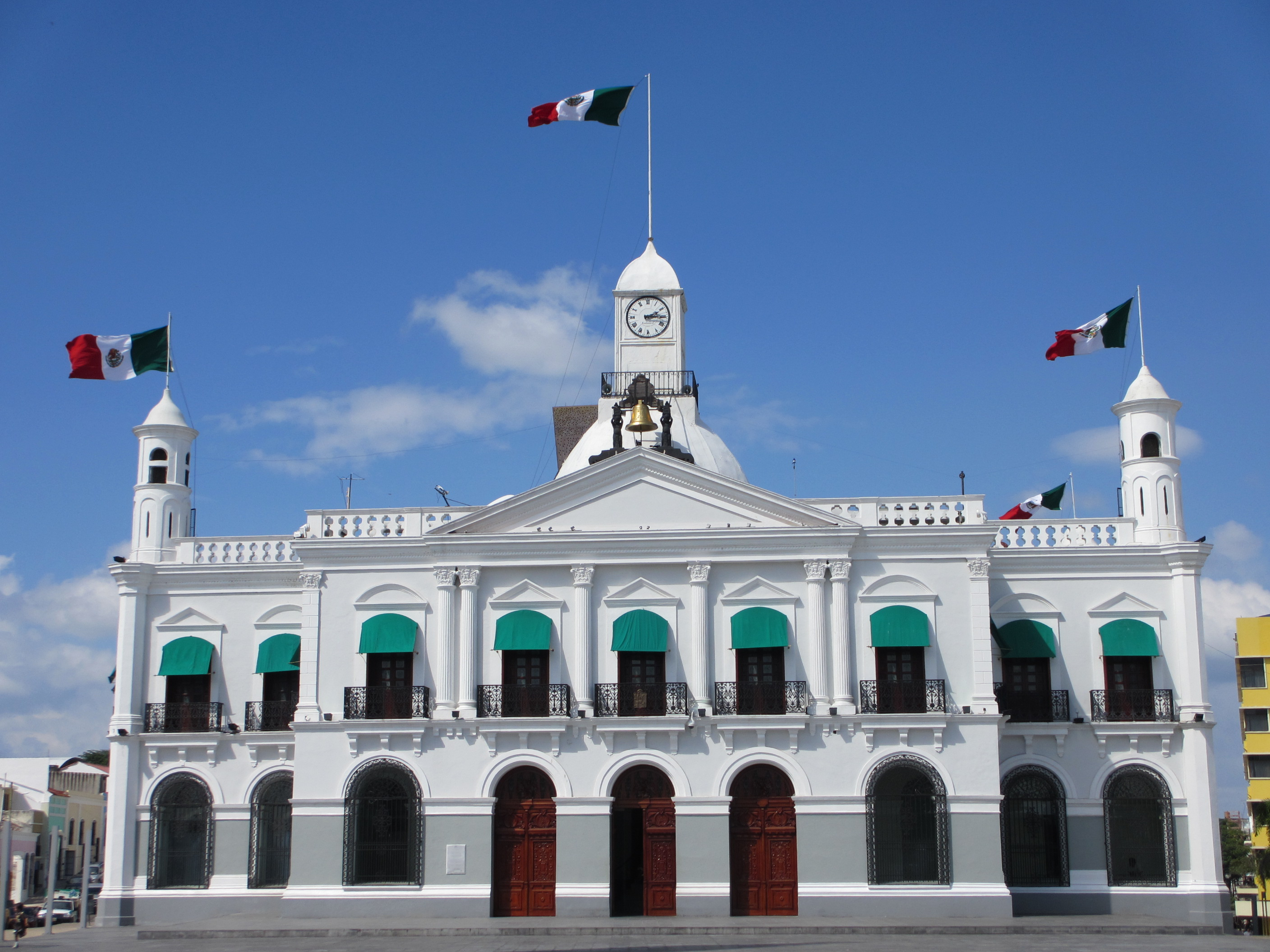
Palacio de Gobierno de Tabasco in 2012

Palacio de Gobierno de Tabasco is a government building which houses the headquarters of the executive branch of the state of Tabasco in Mexico.

== History ==
In the last decades of the 19th century, the various offices of the state of Tabasco operated in various rented buildings (for example, the government itself in the former building of the Juárez Institute, which was probably donated to the institute by Simón Sarlat Nova), so there was an increasing need to build an independent government palace. The first concrete proposal was made by Governor Francisco de Lanz y Rolderat in 1880, but he died that same year, so the idea was continued by Lieutenant Governor Manuel Foucher, later governor, who also made attempts to purchase a building owned by the Spanish Deputy Ambassador Pablo Sastré, but he also died (assassinated) in November 1882. The idea of building was then also considered by Governor Manuel Mestre Gorgoll, and finally, on May 15, 1883, the decision was made to purchase the land where the palace could be built. The purchase price of 14,595 pesos and 47 centavos was not paid in full until later, on December 31, 1884.

The foundation stone of the palace was laid on November 23, 1884 by Lauro León Vázquez, who had been the interim governor of the state several times. Although the works, led by the architect Carlos Jerez, were forced to be stopped by Mestre Gorgoll due to the difficult financial situation of the state and the lack of raw materials and skilled labor, construction resumed under Eusebio Castillo Zamudio, who took office in early 1885, with an investment of 3,500.27 pesos. From March 1887, the new governor, Abraham Banadala Patiño, spent only 240 pesos, which he also used to repay the interest on a previous loan, and then Simón Sarlat Nova, who had been the most enthusiastic supporter of the construction, returned to the governor's office, so that the works could restart. He also changed the original plans: he no longer wanted to build the municipal palace on the same plot as the government palace, but planned a judicial palace. Some building materials and furnishings or decorative items were imported: for example, furniture, consoles with Carrara marble surfaces, as well as French candlesticks, glass (some of which is still original), mirrors, tiles, and ironwork.

The building was completed in 1894. A city committee called the Amigos de Simón Sarlat Nova, or "Friends of Simon Sarlat Nova", was entrusted with the organization of the inauguration ceremony, which lasted several days. On December 12, the state orchestra led by Guillermo Eskildsen played in what is now the Plaza de los Troubadours, then known as the Plazuela del Aguila, and the actual inauguration of the palace took place the following day, as did a 21-gun salute to the governor, which was repeated at noon and at 6 p.m. One of the main events of the inauguration was a dance banquet held inside the palace, but only the aristocracy attended. In front of the building, in the Plaza de Armas, an open-air party with fireworks was also held for the common people. It lasted until dawn the next day and ended with the distribution of sweets and drinks to poor children.

Although it was officially called the Government Palace at that time, in fact the northern part housed the state's Chamber of Deputies, and the left wing housed the state's Supreme Court. The upper floor, facing Vicente Guerrero Street, housed the governor's office, and the general ministry was located next door.

Governor Miguel Orrico de los Llanos, who took office in 1955, renovated and expanded the palace: in some places the structure of the building had to be reinforced with concrete beams to prevent it from collapsing. He demolished the annex that had previously been attached to the palace, and in 1956, the foundations of a new five-story annex were also begun on the vacated site. It was inaugurated on November 20, 1957.
